Valasapalle (lit/eng term. 'Migration Village') is a village in Chittoor district of the Indian state of Andhra Pradesh. The village is also a major exporter of farmed goods for the Madanapalle revenue division. The village has vast farmlands that are used to produce many crops; with rural settlements still being present. During certain times of the year, the village attracts visitors due to it being located in relatively close proximity to the prominent Boyakonda Gangamma pilgrimage site.

Demographics
According to the 2011 census, Valasapalle has a population of 4,171. The overall literacy rate for the village was 68.86%, of which 76.41% Males and 60.70% females were literate.

Languages
The main dialect of the village is Telugu, with some of the population speaking Hindi; along with English

Religion
The main religion of the area is Hinduism, followed by Islam and Christianity.

Governance and politics
Valasapalle is a Gram Panchayat village and is governed by a sarpanch whom is elected by a cabinet of panch's, these cabinet members serve for a period of 5 years.

Transport

Roads
The villages main road is its namesake Valasapalli Rd.

Bus
The village has a local bus stop (Nadigadda Bus Stop).

Rail

Climate

Source : Climate

References

Villages in Chittoor district